Viji (known by his stage name Sarigama Viji) is an Indian actor in the Kannada film industry, and a theatre artist in Karnataka, India.

Personal life
Sarigama Viji is married and has a son.

Career
Before pursuing his acting career, he worked in NGEF.

Films 
Sarigama Viji's debut as an actor was 1980 Kannada film Belavalada Madilalli. As of 2018, he acted in around 269 films in Kannada. In 80 films, he worked as an Assistant director.

Theater works 
Samsaradalli Sarigama, a theatre play which he directed and acted, is played more than 1390 times, in Bangalore, Hyderabad, Chennai, Delhi and Mumbai. His theatre group, Yashasvi is the creator of the play.

Television 
Sarigama Viji directed around 2,400 soaps/serials. He is a part of many television soap/serials including as a jury in reality show, Comedy Khiladigalu Championship, which aired in Zee Kannada.

Selected filmography
 Swartharatna (2018)
Jagath Kiladi (1998)
Kempaiah IPS (1993)

See also

List of people from Karnataka
Cinema of Karnataka
List of Indian film actors
Cinema of India

References

External links

Male actors in Kannada cinema
Indian male film actors
Male actors from Karnataka
20th-century Indian male actors
21st-century Indian male actors
Male actors in Kannada theatre
Living people
Kannada people
Male actors in Kannada television
Year of birth missing (living people)